The 1981 Women's Junior World Handball Championship was the 3rd edition of the tournament which took place in Canada from 17 to 25 October.

Eleven teams competed in the competition from three continents with three nations debuting in the competition. The gold medal went to the Soviet Union who finished top of the final group round-robin after winning their four games which included a two goal win over second place Yugoslavia. West Germany finished in third place.

Group stage

Group A

Group B

Group C

Final round

Group 7-11

Group 1-6

Ranking
The final rankings from the 1981 edition:

References

External links 

Women's Junior World Handball
Women's Junior World Handball Championship, 1981
1981
Junior Handball
Handball in Canada
1981 in handball